The Piper PA-46 Malibu and Matrix, now known as the M-Class, are a family of American light aircraft manufactured by Piper Aircraft of Vero Beach, Florida. The aircraft is powered by a single engine and has the capacity for one pilot and five passengers. Early Malibus were all piston-engined, but a turboprop version, introduced as the Malibu Meridian but now called the M500, is also available. Currently, Piper offers the M350, M500, and M600 in the PA-46 family.

The PA-46 was the third single-engined piston aircraft with a pressurized cabin to reach the market, after the Mooney M22 and Cessna P210 Centurion, and is the only one still in production.

Development

Work on the PA-46 began in the late 1970s, with a prototype (the PA-46-300T) first flying on November 30, 1979. The type was announced in November 1982, apparently to compete with Cessna's newest creation of the era, the P210 Centurion. Like the Centurion, the Malibu was to feature cabin pressurization , a feature not included on the prototype.

Variants

PA-46-310P Malibu

The first example of the initial production version flew in August 1982, and FAA certification was obtained in September 1983. Deliveries started two months later. 404 aircraft with Continental TSIO-520 engines were built before this model was replaced in production by the PA-46-350P Malibu Mirage.

The PA-46-310P has lower fuel consumption, greater range, and the ability to cruise at "lean-of-peak."

All three records were set by Steve Stout in his 1986 Malibu N9114B.

The Continental TSIO-520-BE powered Malibu was discontinued in 1988 following a series of incidents and accidents attributed to engine failures.  One such accident resulted in a settlement in which Teledyne Continental Motors paid $32,125,000 to a pilot injured in the crash of a Malibu.

PA-46-350P Malibu Mirage

Production of the Malibu Mirage commenced in October 1988 for the 1989 model year. New features included a more powerful Lycoming TIO-540-AE2A  engine and a new wing. Various changes have occurred over the model years. Earlier models had an all-King panel and later this became largely Garmin, the Garmin G1000 glass cockpit is now standard.

In 1995, the pilot's windshield became a glass assembly (earlier it had been acrylic glass with a heat strip overlay). In 1996, numerous switches were moved to an overhead console. In 1999, the Mirage gained the strengthened wing designed for the turboprop Meridian.

PA-46-500TP Malibu Meridian

Certification was achieved in September 2000 and deliveries began in November that year. Changes made to allow for turboprop power include larger wings and tail surfaces. In 2009, Piper began offering the Meridian with a three-screen version of the Garmin G1000 including the Garmin GFC 700 autopilot as a replacement for the Avidyne Entegra system.

Piper M-Class

Piper Aircraft no longer refers to their top-of-the-line aircraft with the names Malibu, Malibu Mirage or Malibu Meridian.  The PA-46 line of aircraft, as of 2015, is now referred to as the Piper M-Class. The M350, M500 and the newest M600 make up the entire M-Class line.  The models range in price from the M350 at $1.478 million, to $2.3 million for the M500, to the flagship M600 whose pricing starts at over $3.3 million.

M350

The M350 is an updated version of the Mirage. The M350 is fitted with the same  turbocharged Lycoming TIO-540-AE2A engine and Hartzell three-bladed propeller as the Mirage. Improvements over the Mirage are an Ametek digital fuel quantity system and an improved Garmin G1000 NXi flight system. The new Garmin system has envelope-protection and anti-hypoxia tools. It will initiate an emergency descent in the case that the pilot becomes incapacitated as a result of hypoxia.

M500

The M500 is an updated version of the Meridian.  It also has the updated Garmin G1000 NXi flight system, like the M350.  The G1000 NXi system includes an automatic wings-level function and control override to prevent exceeding the plane's flight envelope. Its purpose is to maintain a safe, stable flight condition in the case of pilot disorientation or incapacitation.  The safety feature is called Electronic Stability and Protection (ESP).
The M500 also has ADS-B, but no FADEC.  The M500's fuel tanks can carry  and its Pratt & Whitney PT6A-42A engine burns .
The M500, at a price of $2.26M  has few competitors, including the cheaper sister-ship, Piper M350, the $2.3M Cirrus Vision SF50, the $3M Epic E1000 and the $3M Eclipse 550.

M600

In 2015, Piper introduced the M600, as an upgrade to the M500.  The M600 has  and a price tag of $2.82 million.  The new M600 is equipped with the Garmin G3000, a new wing and more fuel capacity.  The aircraft is more capable than the M500, as the M600 has greater range and a slightly higher top speed. It has anti-hypoxia tools like in the M350.

It received its FAA certification on June 18, 2016. The M600's standard equipped weight is  higher than the M500's.

Between June 2016 and March 2018, 50 have been delivered, mostly in the U.S. and mostly are owner-flown.
It offers nearly the range of the TBM 900 for much less cost, and can operate from shorter runways than very light jets like the Eclipse 500 or the Citation Mustang.
It burns  (56.3 usgal/hr) in the first hour,  (50 usgal/hr) the second hour and  thereafter, averaging 270 lb/hr per hour, while $125–130 per hour has to be budgeted for the 1,800 h engine midlife inspection before the $150,000–200,000 3,600 h overhaul.

Starting in 2020, Piper will offer an emergency autoland system by Garmin, which initiates at the push of a button. Built into the G3000 integrated avionics for the new SLS model, the system will be a first in general aviation, along with the Cirrus Vision Jet. Piper calls the technology "HALO".

PA-46R-350T Matrix

In October 2007 Piper announced the Matrix, an unpressurized version of the Mirage. The new model has been designated as the PA-46R-350T, indicating retractable landing gear, and turbocharging.

Piper Aircraft is marketing the Matrix as a cabin-class aircraft for Cirrus SR-22 and Cessna 400 owners to step up to.

Standard equipment on the Matrix includes a built-in oxygen system, Avidyne Entegra glass cockpit, S-Tec 55X autopilot and air conditioning.

Major options on the Matrix are a de-ice system, an "Enhanced Situational Awareness Package", speed brakes, an avionics package featuring the Avidyne TAS610 dual antenna traffic advisory system, GWX-68 Weather Radar, and, beginning in 2010, the Garmin G1000 avionics system with twin 10" PFD's and a 15" MFD.

The Matrix's powerplant is a turbocharged Lycoming TI0-540-AE2A producing .

Matrix deliveries began in early 2008.

JetPROP

The JetPROP is an aftermarket turbine engine conversion for the PA-46-310P Malibu and PA-46-350P Malibu Mirage offered by Rocket Engineering of Spokane, WA. Originally certified in 1998 as the JetPROP DLX with a Pratt & Whitney PT6A-34 engine, conversions 90 and above used the P&W PT6A-35, after the -34 was discontinued. A lower cost JetPROP DL version became available in October 2003 utilizing the P&W PT6A-21. As of September 2008, 233 JetPROP conversions had been delivered. Twenty percent of the entire PA-46 fleet have been converted.

ZeroAvia HyFlyer 
ZeroAvia, a Cranfield University partner, is a U.S./UK startup developing a Hydrogen fuel cell power train targeting to halve a turbine operating costs.
It flight-tests a pair of  electric motors replacing the piston engine of a Piper Malibu Mirage in California.
In September 2019, the UK government granted £2.7 million ($3.3 million) for its HyFlyer demonstrator, culminating in a  flight using hydrogen fuel cells.
Other partners, including the Orkney Isles-based EMEC, Cranfield Aerospace Solutions, and fuel-cell developer Intelligent Energy should match this funding. The prototype made its maiden hydrogen-powered flight at Cranfield Airport on September 24, 2020.

Production

Accidents and incidents
, 225 accidents had been reported in the Aviation Safety Network wiki database, including 106 hull losses, causing 219 fatalities. Hull losses represent % of the 1177 PA-46s produced from 2002 through 2017.

On 21 January 2019, a PA-46-310P travelling from Nantes Atlantique Airport, France, to Cardiff Airport, Wales, crashed into the water off Alderney in the English Channel. Britain's Air Accidents Investigation Branch found there had been operational irregularities and probable carbon monoxide poisoning of the pilot. The plane was carrying Argentine footballer Emiliano Sala, who had been signed by Cardiff City from FC Nantes two days earlier. The plane's wreckage was discovered on the seabed of the English Channel on 3 February, and Sala was confirmed to be dead on 7 February.

Specifications

See also

References

External links

 
 
 
 
 
 
 
 
 
 

PA-46
1980s United States civil utility aircraft
Single-engined tractor aircraft
Low-wing aircraft
Aircraft first flown in 1979
Single-engined turboprop aircraft